Steve Allen (1921–2000) was an American television personality, musician, comedian, and writer. 

Steve Allen may also refer to:

Steve Allen (radio presenter) (born 1954), English presenter on the London-based UK National talk radio station LBC
Steve Allen (singer), New Zealand singer who had a hit with "Join Together" in 1974
Steve Allen, British vocalist with Deaf School
Steve Allen, leader of the White Label Space team competing in the Google Lunar X PRIZE

See also
Stephen Allen (disambiguation)
Stephen Allen (1767–1852), Mayor of New York
Stephen Allan (born 1973), Australian golfer
Steven Allan (born 1956), Australian footballer
Allen (surname)